Small Change is the fourth studio album by singer and songwriter Tom Waits, released on September 21, 1976 on Asylum Records. It was recorded in July at Wally Heider's Studio 3 in Hollywood. It was successful commercially and outsold his previous albums. This resulted in Waits putting together a touring band - The Nocturnal Emissions, which consisted of Frank Vicari on tenor saxophone, FitzGerald Jenkins on bass guitar and Chip White on drums and vibraphone. The Nocturnal Emissions toured Europe and the United States extensively from October 1976 till May 1977.

Production

Small Change was recorded, direct to 2-track stereo tape, July 15, 19–21 and 29, 1976 at Wally Heider's Studio 3 in Hollywood under the production of Bones Howe. A multi-track recording was made as back up, and used when a reference Waits made to actress Jayne Meadows had to be changed. Howe recounted: "We set up at Heider's for that record the same way I used to make jazz records in the 1950s. I wanted to take Tom back to that direction of making records, with an orchestra and Tom in the same room, all playing and singing together. I was never afraid of making a record where the musicians all breathed the same air. Leakage is not a problem. In fact, it's a good thing — it holds a record together... He was always surrounded by the music and the records sound like it. We never used headphones. Never."

Music
The album featured famed drummer Shelly Manne, and was, like Waits' previous albums, heavily jazz-influenced, with a lyrical style that owed influence to Raymond Chandler and Charles Bukowski as well as a vocal delivery influenced by Louis Armstrong, Dr. John and Howlin' Wolf. The music, for the most part, consists of Waits' gravelly, rough voice, set against a backdrop of piano, upright bass, drums and saxophone. Some tracks have a string section, whose sweet timbre is starkly contrasted to Waits' voice.

"Tom Traubert's Blues" opens the album. Jay S. Jacobs has described the song as a "stunning opener [which] sets the tone for what follows." The refrain is based almost word by word on the 1890 Australian song, "Waltzing Matilda" by A.B. "Banjo" Paterson, although the tune is slightly different.

The origin of the song is somewhat ambiguous. The sub-title of the track "Four Sheets to the Wind in Copenhagen" seems to indicate that it is about a time that Waits spent in Copenhagen in 1976 while on a tour. There, he apparently met Danish singer Mathilde Bondo. Indeed, in a 1998 radio interview, she confirmed that she met Waits and that they spent a night on the town together. Waits himself described the song's subject during a concert in Sydney, Australia in March 1979: "Uh, well I met this girl named Matilda. And uh, I had a little too much to drink that night. This is about throwing up in a foreign country." In an interview on NPR's World Cafe, aired December 15, 2006, Waits stated that Tom Traubert was a "friend of a friend" who died in prison.

Bones Howe, the album's producer, recalls when Waits first came to him with the song:

 He said the most wonderful thing about writing that song. He went down and hung around on skid row in L.A. because he wanted to get stimulated for writing this material. He called me up and said, "I went down to skid row ... I bought a pint of rye. In a brown paper bag." I said, "Oh really?" "Yeah - hunkered down, drank the pint of rye, went home, threw up, and wrote 'Tom Traubert's Blues' [...] Every guy down there ... everyone I spoke to, a woman put him there."

Howe was amazed when he first heard the song, and he's still astonished by it. "I do a lot of seminars," he says. "Occasionally I'll do something for songwriters. They all say the same thing to me. 'All the great lyrics are done.' And I say, 'I'm going to give you a lyric that you never heard before. Howe then says to his aspiring songwriters, "A battered old suitcase to a hotel someplace / And a wound that will never heal." This particular Tom Waits lyric Howe considers to be "brilliant." It's "the work of an extremely talented lyricist, poet, whatever you want to say. That is brilliant, brilliant work. And he never mentions the person, but you see the person."

The song has been recorded by Rod Stewart on two 1993 albums, Lead Vocalist and Unplugged...and Seated under the title "Tom Traubert's Blues (Waltzing Matilda)".

The album's closing song, "I Can't Wait to Get Off Work (And See My Baby on Montgomery Avenue)", has a simple musical arrangement, boasting only Waits' voice and piano, with bass by Jim Hughart. The lyrics are about Waits' first job at Napoleone Pizza House in San Diego, which he began in 1965, at the age of 16.

Themes

At the time of the recording of Small Change Waits was drinking more and more heavily, and life on the road was starting to take its toll on him. Waits, looking back at the period said:I was sick through that whole period [...] It was starting to wear on me, all the touring. I'd been travelling quite a bit, living in hotels, eating bad food, drinking a lot - too much. There's a lifestyle that's there before you arrive and you're introduced to it. It's unavoidable.

Waits recorded the album in reaction to these hardships. This is evident in the pessimism and cynicism that pervade the record, with many songs, such as "The Piano Has Been Drinking" and "Bad Liver and a Broken Heart" presenting a bare and honest portrayal of alcoholism, while also cementing Waits' hard-living reputation in the eyes of many fans. The album's themes include those of desolation, deprivation, and, above all else, alcoholism. The cast of characters, which includes hookers, strippers and small-time losers, are, for the most part, night-owls and drunks; people lost in a cold, urban world.

With the album Waits asserted that he "tried to resolve a few things as far as this cocktail-lounge, maudlin, crying-in-your-beer image that I have. There ain't nothin' funny about a drunk [...] I was really starting to believe that there was something amusing and wonderfully American about being a drunk. I ended up telling myself to cut that shit out."

Beyond the serious themes with which the album deals, the lyrics are often also noted for their humour; with songs such as "The Piano Has Been Drinking" and "Bad Liver And A Broken Heart" including puns and jokes in their treatment of alcoholism, with the added humour in Waits' drunken diction.

Cover
The cover art features Waits sitting in a go-go dancer's dressing room, with a topless go-go dancer standing nearby. It was alleged that the go-go dancer pictured is Cassandra Peterson, best known as the iconic character Elvira, Mistress of the Dark. Peterson, however, says she's not sure of the authenticity of this claim.

Reception

Small Change received critical reviews equal to or better than Waits' previous albums, and was at first a surprise commercial success, rising to #89 on the Billboard chart within two weeks of its release.  Three weeks later,  the album fell off the Billboard Top 200, and Waits was not to better its position until 1999's Mule Variations.

When asked in an interview with Mojo in 1999 if he shared many fans' view that Small Change was the crowning moment of his "beatnik-glory-meets-Hollywood-noir period" (i.e. from 1973 to 1980), Waits replied:  Well, gee. I'd say there's probably more songs off that record that I continued to play on the road, and that endured. Some songs you may write and record but you never sing them again. Others you sing em every night and try and figure out what they mean. "Tom Traubert's Blues" was certainly one of those songs I continued to sing, and in fact, close my show with.

In 2000, Small Change was voted number 958 in Colin Larkin's All Time Top 1000 Albums.

Track listing
All songs written and composed by Tom Waits.

Side one

Side two

Personnel
Tom Waits - vocals, piano
Harry Bluestone – violin, concertmaster strings
 Jim Hughart – bass
 Ed Lustgarten – cello, orchestra manager strings
Shelly Manne – drums
Lew Tabackin – tenor saxophone
Jerry Yester – arranger and conductor of string section

Chart positions

Certifications

References

External links
MacLaren, Trevor, "Tom Waits: Small Change", 2004 March 2 All About Jazz.com link

Tom Waits albums
1976 albums
Asylum Records albums
Albums produced by Bones Howe